Looking Back (1998) is an autobiography written by the American author Lois Lowry, in which she uses photographs and accompanying text to construct a picture of her life.

External links

American autobiographies